Van Dyne is a Dutch surname.

Notable people with the name include:

 George Van Dyne (1933–1981), pioneer of systems ecology
 Janet van Dyne, a fictional superhero appearing in Marvel Comics
 Van Dyne, Wisconsin, unincorporated census-designated place in Fond du Lac County, Wisconsin
 Van Dyne Civic Building, historic courthouse building located in Bradford County, Pennsylvania
 Van Dyne Crotty, American uniform laundering and rental company
 Vernon Van Dyne, distinguished U.S. Army Officer

See also
 Dyne, a unit of force

Dutch-language surnames